Christian Martin Schmidt (born 10 November 1942) is a German musicologist and music theorist.

Life 
Born in Dessau, Schmidt studied musicology from 1963 at the University of Hamburg, as well as in Tübingen, Paris, Göttingen and Berlin. In 1970 he received his doctorate at the FU Berlin from Rudolf Stephan.

Subsequently, Schmidt worked on the Arnold Schönberg complete edition. After his habilitation (with an analytical work on Schönberg's Moses und Aron) and a professorship in Amsterdam, he held the chair of Music history at the Technical University Berlin from 1991 until his emeritus as successor to Carl Dahlhaus.

Since 1992 he has been project manager of the Leipzig Edition of the Works of Felix Mendelssohn Bartholdy at the Saxon Academy of Sciences and Humanities.

A further focus of his work, besides the music history of the 19th and 20th centuries, is the work of Johannes Brahms.

Publications 
 Verfahren der motivisch-thematischen Vermittlung in der Musik von Johannes Brahms dargestellt an der Klarinettensonate f-Moll, op. 120/1. Munich 1971 (Berliner musikwissenschaftliche Arbeiten. 2).
 Schönbergs Oper "Moses und Aron". Mainz 1988. 
 Johannes Brahms. Stuttgart 1994 (Reclam Musikführer). 
 with Giselher Schubert, Constantin Floros: Johannes Brahms – die Sinfonien. Einführung, Kommentar, Analyse. Schott, Mainz 1998, .
 Music Analysis: not Universal, not Almighty, but Indispensable. In Music Analysis.'' 21, 2002, special edition, .

References

External links 
 
 Veröffentlichungen von Christian Martin Schmidt in BMS online

Musicologists from Berlin
20th-century German musicologists
German music theorists
Academic staff of the Technical University of Berlin
1942 births
Living people
People from Dessau-Roßlau